Kylie Hanigan (born 18 November 1971) is an Australian sprinter. She competed in the women's 4 × 100 metres relay at the 1996 Summer Olympics.

References

External links
 

1971 births
Living people
Athletes (track and field) at the 1996 Summer Olympics
Australian female sprinters
Olympic athletes of Australia
Place of birth missing (living people)
People from Manly, New South Wales
Sportswomen from New South Wales
Athletes from Sydney
Olympic female sprinters